was the last King of Chūzan and the first king of the Ryukyu Kingdom, uniting the three polities of Chūzan, Hokuzan, and Nanzan by conquest and ending the Sanzan period.

Family
 Father: Shishō
 mother: daughter of Miiko
 Wife: sister of Inami Ryoji
 Children:
 Hirata Sashiki
 Shō Chū
 Sho Nankijin
 Seiji Yasuji
 Sho Kinpuku
 Sho Furi
 Sho Taikyu
 Maeda Ajinosuke

Biography 
As lord (aji) of Sashiki Magiri, he was seen as an able, well-liked administrator within his own lands who rose in prominence at the opening of the 15th century. He led a small rebellion against the lord of Azato district in 1402, however some historians believe it was against the neighboring Ōzato Castle. Hashi then went on to overthrow chief Bunei of Chūzan in 1404 and placed his father Shō Shishō on the throne. Even with his father as chief, however, Hashi held true political power, and organized envoys to Nanking, to assure China, to which the Ryūkyū polities were tributaries, of his polity's continued cooperation and friendship. He also reorganized much of the administrative organs of the kingdom to better fit Chinese models. The people of Chūzan also quickly adopted many elements of Chinese culture, and came to be recognized as "civilized", at least somewhat more so than earlier, by the Chinese. Hashi also oversaw the expansion and embellishment of Shuri Castle, and the placement of distance markers throughout the land, marking the distance to Shuri.

Meanwhile, though Hokuzan, the neighboring polity to the north, held no advantages over Chūzan economically or in terms of political influence, Hashi viewed their capital city castle of Nakijin Castle as a threat militarily. When that opportunity presented itself in 1419, after three Hokuzan aji (local lords) turned to his side, Hashi led his father's army, and conquered Nakijin in a swift series of attacks. The chief of Hokuzan, along with his closest retainers, committed suicide after a fierce resistance. A year after his father's death in 1421, Hashi requested official recognition and investiture from the Chinese imperial court, and received it in due course. It may be interesting to note that, despite the nominal independence of Ryūkyū into the 19th century, this practice would continue. In 1428, the Xuande Emperor bestowed upon him the family name Shang (Shō in Japanese), registered a new title in their annals: Liuqiu Wang (琉球王, Jap: Ryūkyū-Ō, King of Ryūkyū), and sent Hashi's emissary back with a ceremonial dragon robe, and a lacquer tablet with the word Chūzan inscribed upon it. This Chūzan tablet was then placed on display on the Chūzan gate in front of Shuri Castle, where it remained until the early 20th century.

Thus, succeeding his father as chief of Chūzan in 1422, and appointing his younger brother Warden of Hokuzan, he seized Nanzan Castle, capital of Nanzan, in 1429, from Lord Taromai. Thus uniting the island of Okinawa, he founded the Ryūkyū Kingdom and the Shō dynasty.

Up to this point, the three polities had operated on a very simple feudal model. Peasants were subsistence farmers who paid taxes to their local aji and performed various other labors and services to him; the aji in turn owed taxes and services to the head of their polity (hypothetically a chief, but called a prince in many English-language texts on the subject). Shō Hashi did not effect drastic dramatic changes upon this system, but reinforced it as part of his unification efforts; aji were made to owe their allegiance to his royal government at Shuri, rather than becoming lordless rebels or the like upon the defeat and absorption of their kingdom. Hashi also oversaw a significant expansion of trade, particularly with China, and organized envoys to other Asian countries as well. Documents survive today chronicling a number of missions to Ayutthaya, the capital of Siam at the time, to resolve trade issues. Recognizing the importance of trade to Ryūkyū's continued prosperity, Shō Hashi promoted it strongly, and even ordered a bell cast and installed at Shuri Castle, upon which was inscribed "Ships are means of communication with all nations; the country is full of rare products and precious treasures."

Through this trade, friendly diplomatic relations, and the overall organization and unity created by Shō Hashi, Ryūkyū absorbed much of the foreign influences that would come to define its culture. Some examples include the Chinese ceremonial robes worn by kings and high officials when meeting with Chinese officials, the Japanese-inspired custom of aristocratic members of society wearing two swords, and the fusion of native, Japanese, Chinese, and Southeast Asian elements of music and dance.

Shō Hashi died in 1439, at the age of sixty-eight, having united Ryūkyū and established its place as a small, but recognized, power in the region. Upon his death, the court appointed his second son, Shō Chū, his successor, and sent emissaries to the Chinese court to ask for investiture, to the Japanese Shōgun in Kyoto and to the courts of a number of other kingdoms, as diplomatic missions.

In popular culture
 On 28 August 2009 the play King Sho Hashi - Dynamic Ryukyu was hosted by the Okinawa Association of America at the Redondo Beach Performing Arts Center in Los Angeles, California.
 In 2020, Ryukyu Broadcasting Corp aired a three-episode "history drama" about Shō Hashi's rise to power.
 Shō Hashi is referenced by character Chōzen Toguchi in Netflix’s Cobra Kai Season 5 Episode 9 “Survivors” (2022).

See also
 Foreign relations of Imperial China
 Imperial Chinese missions to the Ryukyu Kingdom

Notes

References
 Frédéric, Louis (2002).  Japan Encyclopedia. Cambridge: Harvard University Press. ; OCLC 48943301
 Kerr, George H. and Mitsugu Sakihara. (2000).  Okinawa, the History of an Island People: The History of an Island People. Tokyo: Tuttle Publishing. 
 Smits, Gregory (1999).  Visions of Ryukyu: Identity and Ideology in Early-Modern Thought and Politics. Honolulu: University of Hawai'i Press. ;  OCLC 39633631

1371 births
1439 deaths
Kings of Ryūkyū
First Shō dynasty